Vaknin is a surname. Notable people with the surname include:

Sam Vaknin (born 1961), Israeli writer
Yitzhak Vaknin (born 1958), Israeli politician and member of the Knesset